Manchester Tennis and Racquet Club is a sports club based in Salford just outside Manchester and is the oldest sports facility in Greater Manchester to have retained its use to the present day.

History
The history of the club however did not begin at these premises but in Manchester at Miller Street in 1876 however due to the expansion of the railways in Manchester it was relocated to its current location. The last major modification came in 1925 when a squash court was added to the facility.

Listed building
On 21 January 1996 English Heritage awarded the building Grade II* status.

See also

Grade II* listed buildings in Greater Manchester
Listed buildings in Salford, Greater Manchester

References

External links
 http://www.mtrc.co.uk/

Grade II* listed buildings in Greater Manchester
Buildings and structures in Salford
Sports venues in Salford
Real tennis venues
Tennis clubs